Paracingulina terebra is a species of sea snail, a marine gastropod mollusk in the family Pyramidellidae, the pyrams and their allies.

Description
The white, shining shell measures approximately 8 mm. The twelve whorls of the teleoconch are scarcely convex.  The whorls of the spire show three revolving ribs. The body whorl has eight ribs, the lower ones smaller.

Distribution
This species occurs in the Indo-Pacific Oceans and off the coasts of Japan in the Sea of Japan.

References

External links
 To World Register of Marine Species

Pyramidellidae
Gastropods described in 1860